Kocudza Pierwsza  is a village in the administrative district of Gmina Dzwola, within Janów Lubelski County, Lublin Voivodeship, in eastern Poland.

References

Kocudza Pierwsza
Lublin Governorate
Lublin Voivodeship (1919–1939)